Cristian Tănase (born 18 February 1987) is a Romanian professional footballer who plays as a winger or an attacking midfielder.

He spent most of his years in Romania with Argeș Pitești and FCSB, winning seven domestic trophies with the latter, and also had stints at several clubs in China and Turkey throughout his career.

Internationally, Tănase totalled 40 caps for the Romania national team between 2008 and 2015.

Club career

Argeș Pitești
Tănase began his career as a junior at FC Argeș Pitești, and in the summer of 2003 was promoted to the first team which competed in the Divizia A, the top flight of the Romanian league system. He appeared sparingly during his first years with the seniors and was subsequently loaned to Dacia Mioveni for the first half of the 2005–06 campaign. 

Tănase totalled five games for Mioveni and upon his return to Argeș became an important player, amassing over 100 games before his departure.

Steaua București
On 6 August 2009, Tănase signed a five-year contract with FC Steaua București for an undisclosed fee, reported by media to be €1.8 million for half of his economic rights.

On 13 December 2009, he scored his first goal for Steaua, a 72nd-minute winner in a 3–2 defeat of Internațional Curtea de Argeș. In the 2010–11 season, Tănase scored three goals—two in the UEFA Europa League and one from a volley against Pandurii Târgu Jiu.

In the following season, he netted the goal against CSKA Sofia that qualified his team for the 2011–12 UEFA Europa League group stage. Tănase further contributed with two goals against Maccabi Haifa in that stage of the tournament.

During the 2014–15 campaign, his last at Steaua București, Tănase was named team captain.

Later career
In the summer of 2015, after six years in Bucharest, Tănase joined Tianjin TEDA in China on a two-year contract for a transfer fee of £700,000. The next year, he moved to Turkish team Sivasspor by signing a two-year deal.

After half a season at Sivasspor, Tănase left for another Turkish club, agreeing to a two-year contract with Kardemir Karabükspor. In January 2018, he returned to Steaua București, now renamed FCSB, for a six-month spell with the Roș-albaștrii. 

On 20 July 2018, it was announced that Tănase signed a two-year contract with Eskişehirspor.

International career

Tănase made his debut for the Romania national team in a 2–1 friendly win over Georgia, on 19 November 2008.
On 1 April 2009, he scored his first goal in a 1–2 loss to Austria in the 2010 FIFA World Cup qualifiers.

On 27 January 2012, Tănase scored a double in a 4–0 exhibition thrashing of Turkmenistan.

Career statistics

Club

International

Scores and results list Romania's goal tally first, score column indicates score after each Tănase goal.

Honours
Argeș Pitești
Liga II: 2007–08

Steaua București
Liga I: 2012–13, 2013–14, 2014–15
Cupa României: 2010–11; 2014–15; runner-up: 2013–14
Supercupa României: 2013; runner-up: 2011, 2014
Cupa Ligii: 2014–15

References
Notes

Citations

External links

 

1987 births
Living people
Sportspeople from Pitești
Romanian footballers
Association football midfielders
Association football wingers
Liga I players
Liga II players
FC Argeș Pitești players
CS Mioveni players
FC Steaua București players
LPS HD Clinceni players
Chinese Super League players
Tianjin Jinmen Tiger F.C. players
Süper Lig players
TFF First League players
Sivasspor footballers
Kardemir Karabükspor footballers
Eskişehirspor footballers
Giresunspor footballers
Romania youth international footballers
Romania under-21 international footballers
Romania international footballers
Romanian expatriate footballers
Expatriate footballers in China
Romanian expatriate sportspeople in China
Expatriate footballers in Turkey
Romanian expatriate sportspeople in Turkey